Scum (stylized in all caps) is the debut studio album by English Musician Rat Boy. It was released on 11 August 2017 via Parlophone.
The album peaked at number 15 on the UK Albums Chart.

Critical reception

SCUM was met with generally favorable reviews from music critics. At Metacritic, which assigns a normalized rating out of 100 to reviews from mainstream publications, the album received an average score of 74 based on ten reviews. The aggregator AnyDecentMusic? has the critical consensus of the album at a 6.8 out of 10, based on thirteen reviews.

AllMusic's Neil Z. Yeung wrote: "forgiving those space fillers, Scum remains a great pleasure, the product of a young mind brimming with ideas coupled with enough youthful bravery to take such risks". Emma Swann of DIY wrote: "on this debut, Jordan and pals aren't afraid to contrast bravado with vulnerability, and it's in the unexpected that their debut shines brightes". Paul Moody of Q wrote: "the 21-year-old's eclectic debut oozes attitude, his pithy social commentary binding together sonic excursions into breezy funk-punk, poundshop hip-hop and indie tearjerkers". Hannah J Davies of The Guardian noticed: "some gimmicky Grand Theft Auto-style radio interludes aside, this is a state-of-the-nation record that's as sparkly as it is snarky". Will Rosebury of Clash wrote: "although SCUM can sometimes feel like the 2017 update of music you've enjoyed from the past 20 years, at its best Rat Boy delivers some of the most interesting and exciting moments to come from British music this year". Steven Loftin of The Line of Best Fit wrote: "if you aren't into skits and novelty voice acting then you might struggle with the twenty five-high track listing. If you are though, you're in for a treat".

In mixed reviews, Chris White of musicOMH found the album "rarely subtle and its relentless pace can become a little bit much at times. Yet there's enough promise here to suggest that with more development and quality control, Ratboy could grow into an artist of significant stature". Will Pritchard of NME described the album "more revolt than revolution. But there's undoubtedly talent here--and there’s every chance Cardy, not T, will be the touchpoint 10 years from now". Thomas H Green of The Arts Desk resumed: "it's a bouncy, youthful, over-excited Labrador of a thing". Damien Morris of The Observer wrote: "what starts off as a gang-signing, car-stealing, signing-on 21st-century Clash ends up as Jamie T robbing Jesus Jones, far more Westfield than Westway".

Accolades

Track listing

Personnel
Jordan Cardy – vocals, keyboards, guitar, co-producer
Damon Albarn – backing vocals, keyboards
Junior Dan – bass
Noah Booth – drums
Graham Coxon – guitar
Nick Hodgson – drums
Mallory Merk – additional vocals
Jason Cox – producer
James Dring – producer
Stephen Street – producer

Charts

References

External links

Rat Boy albums
2017 debut albums
Parlophone albums
Albums produced by Stephen Street